Brittney Denise Parks (born January 29, 1994), better known by her stage name Sudan Archives, is an American violinist, singer, and songwriter based in Los Angeles, California. Parks learned to play the violin by ear as a young child in Cincinnati, Ohio.

Signed to Stones Throw Records, Parks has released two studio albums to date: Athena (2019) and Natural Brown Prom Queen (2022).

Early life
Sudan Archives was born Brittney Denise Parks, and grew up in Cincinnati, Ohio. She began playing violin in fourth grade, learning by ear. Parks' stepfather worked at the Atlanta-based record label LaFace Records and suggested that she and her twin sister, Cat, form a pop duo called N2 and aim for commercial success. Parks recalls: "I felt stifled – it wasn't good for my creativity. All through high school I was a punk. I never stood up for the pledge of allegiance and I didn't sit with anyone at lunch. I just wanted to get out." After attending several late-night raves, Parks felt inspired to follow her own musical inclinations and left home for Los Angeles: "Watching those artists, I realised that I didn't need to be in a band. I could do this by myself. My parents told me I couldn't live with them if I kept going out. So I left."
 
Parks studied ethnomusicology at Pasadena City College, while attending the experimental club night Low End Theory and working on her own musical material on her iPad. Embarking on a journey "to show the Blackness of the violin," Parks studied the history of violin performers across different cultures, noting: "I found violinists who looked like me in Africa, playing it so wildly. It's such a serious instrument in a western concert setting, but in so many other places in the world it brings the party."

Career

2017–2021: Early releases and Athena
Sudan Archives released her self-titled debut EP in 2017 and followed it with the Sink EP in 2018. The EP's lead single, "Nont for Sale", ranked as one of Stereogums favorite songs in May 2018. Parks released her debut studio album, Athena, the following year. The album received widespread critical acclaim from publications such as The Guardian, which said it contained "some of the most viscerally gorgeous music put to record", The Quietus, which commended Parks for her "knack for writing massive hooks that will dig straight into your brain", Variety, which described Athena as "innovative, unusual and inviting", and many more.

2022–present: Natural Brown Prom Queen
On March 16, 2022, Parks returned with "Home Maker", her first new track in three years and the first single from her second studio album, Natural Brown Prom Queen. Pitchfork made it one of their Best New Tracks and described it as Parks' "most approachable yet, a swaggering statement of intent with all the idiosyncratic charm that makes her music so memorable". Parks headlined the Stones Throw showcase at South by Southwest the following day. 

On September 9, 2022, Natural Brown Prom Queen was released to widespread critical acclaim, with Parks noting of the album's variety: "It felt like time to let people know who I am. My stage name is kind of academic and on Athena, I created this thoughtful persona centred on divine Black femininity. Now I want to show my looseness, too. I'm a deep, insightful person, but I'm also fucking silly."

Musical style and influences
Sudan Archives has taken inspiration from a variety of African musicians, including Cameroonian electronic musician Francis Bebey and Sudanese violinist Asim Gorashi. She is also inspired by Irish music. When performing, Sudan Archives sometimes uses electronic effects pedals and electronic beats and has also performed in a string quartet.

Personal life
Parks has a twin sister named Cat, with whom she was briefly part of a pop duo called N2.

Parks lives in Los Angeles, and as of the COVID-19 pandemic has been dating James McCall, better known by the stage names Nocando and All City Jimmy. Parks and McCall built a home studio together in her basement, where she recorded her second studio album, Natural Brown Prom Queen.

Discography

Studio albums
 Athena (2019)
 Natural Brown Prom Queen (2022)

EPs
 Sudan Archives (2017)
 Sink (2018)

Singles
 "Water" (2017)
 "Nont for Sale" (2018)
 "Confessions" (2019)
 "Glorious" (2019)
 "Confessions (Velvet Negroni Remix)" (2020)
 "Glorious (Nídia Remix)" (2020)
 "Home Maker" (2022)
 "Selfish Soul" (2022)

References

External links
 
 Sudan Archives at Bandcamp
 
 NPR Tiny Desk concert

Year of birth missing (living people)
Living people
Musicians from Cincinnati
21st-century American violinists
21st-century American women singers
21st-century violinists
Stones Throw Records artists
21st-century American singers
American women singer-songwriters
Singer-songwriters from Ohio
Pasadena City College alumni
Twin musicians